Lake City (formerly, Tri-Lake City) is a census-designated place in Modoc County, California. Its population is 71 as of the 2020 census, up from 61 from the 2010 census.

The first post office at Lake City opened in 1868. Lake City's ZIP Code is 96115.

A 1913 book described Lake City as being near Upper Alkali Lake and having a population of about 150.

The city is mentioned in the 1995 travel novel California Fault by author Thurston Clarke, when he referenced the area of Modoc County by his great-grandfather's travels in the 1850s in the Fandango Pass.

Geography
According to the United States Census Bureau, the CDP covers an area of 5.8 square miles (15.1 km), 99.96% of it land, and 0.04% of it water.

Demographics
The 2010 United States Census reported that Lake City had a population of 61. The population density was 10.5 people per square mile (4.0/km). The racial makeup of Lake City was 58 (95.1%) White, 1 (0.02%) African American, 0 (0.0%) Native American, 0 (0.0%) Asian, 0 (0.0%) Pacific Islander, 0 (0.0%) from other races, and 3 (4.9%) from two or more races.  Hispanic or Latino of any race were 0 persons (0.0%).

The Census reported that 61 people (100% of the population) lived in households, 0 (0%) lived in non-institutionalized group quarters, and 0 (0%) were institutionalized.

There were 34 households, out of which 6 (17.6%) had children under the age of 18 living in them, 16 (47.1%) were opposite-sex married couples living together, 2 (5.9%) had a female householder with no husband present, 1 (2.9%) had a male householder with no wife present.  There were 2 (5.9%) unmarried opposite-sex partnerships, and 0 (0%) same-sex married couples or partnerships. 14 households (41.2%) were made up of individuals, and 7 (20.6%) had someone living alone who was 65 years of age or older. The average household size was 1.79.  There were 19 families (55.9% of all households); the average family size was 2.32.

The population was spread out, with 8 people (13.1%) under the age of 18, 0 people (0%) aged 18 to 24, 5 people (8.2%) aged 25 to 44, 28 people (45.9%) aged 45 to 64, and 20 people (32.8%) who were 65 years of age or older.  The median age was 62.2 years. For every 100 females, there were 90.6 males.  For every 100 females age 18 and over, there were 89.3 males.

There were 50 housing units at an average density of 8.6 per square mile (3.3/km), of which 31 (91.2%) were owner-occupied, and 3 (8.8%) were occupied by renters. The homeowner vacancy rate was 2.9%; the rental vacancy rate was 25.0%.  55 people (90.2% of the population) lived in owner-occupied housing units and 6 people (9.8%) lived in rental housing units.

Politics

Notable people
 Former United States Army staff sergeant Clinton Romesha, a recipient of the Medal of Honor for actions during the Battle of Kamdesh in 2009 during the war in Afghanistan.

References

Census-designated places in Modoc County, California
Census-designated places in California